Goshi may refer to:

People
Eiko Goshi (born 1954), Japanese swimmer
Goshi Hosono (born 1971), Japanese politician
Goshi Okubo (born 1986), Japanese footballer
Hirokazu Goshi (born 1966), Japanese footballer
Ryūden Gōshi (born 1990), Japanese sumo wrestler

Places
Goshi, Kenya, a settlement in Kenya
Goshi Gewog, a village block of Dagana District, Bhutan
Goshi River, or Voi River, in Kenya
Gōshi Station, in Isesaki, Gunma, Japan

Other uses
22402 Goshi, a minor planet

See also

List of judo techniques, including several Judo throws developed by Kano Jigoro with goshi in the name